Manfred Schneider (born 9 October 1941) is a German rower, who competed for the SC Dynamo Berlin / Sportvereinigung (SV) Dynamo. He won medals at various international rowing competitions.

References 

1941 births
Living people
East German male rowers
Olympic medalists in rowing
World Rowing Championships medalists for East Germany
Medalists at the 1972 Summer Olympics
Olympic bronze medalists for East Germany
Rowers at the 1968 Summer Olympics
Rowers at the 1972 Summer Olympics
Sportspeople from Schwerin